August Freyer (15 December 1801 – 28 May 1883) was a Polish musician and composer, specializing in both performance and composition on the organ.

Biography

August was born in Saxony in 1801.  He moved to Warsaw and began his musical career there as a double bass player.  He became organist at the Warsaw Evangelical Church, had the organ rebuilt, and turned his church into a prominent musical location while becoming the prominent organist and organ teacher in Warsaw.  He made a tour of northern Germany as an organist, from which he received wide acclaim.

August was a musical pupil of Józef Elsner.  He became a close associate of Adolf Friedrich Hesse.  He promoted Hesse's music to Mikhail Glinka, successful in his performance to the point of reducing his listener to tears.  At an early age Stanisław Moniuszko became his pupil, his parents relocated to Warsaw in order to have Stanisław study with Freyer.  He died in 1883.

Style
Freyer was largely responsible for the revival of organ music in Poland. He was a master at music balance, both homophonic and polyphonic.  His playing was appreciated by Felix Mendelssohn and Louis Spohr.  In addition to the aforementioned German concerts, he toured Paris to enthusiastic reception.  His most famous composition was a set of Concert Variations of which the final-movement fugue is the most recognized.

References

External links 
 Scores by August Freyer in digital library Polona

1801 births
1883 deaths
Polish organists
Male organists
Polish Romantic composers
Musicians from Warsaw
Place of birth missing
19th-century male musicians
19th-century organists